League Style is a covers album of 10 reggae and rocksteady classics by English punk rock band Anti-Nowhere League. The album was released on Cleopatra Records in June, 2017.

Track listing

Personnel 
Animal - Orchestral Percussion, Producer, Vocals
Sammy Carnage - Drums, Percussion
Paul Midcalf - Producer
Shady - Bass
Tommy-H - Guitar, Vocals

References 

2017 albums